The South African Railways Class GB 2-6-2+2-6-2 of 1921 was an articulated steam locomotive.

In June 1921, the South African Railways placed a single experimental Class GB Garratt articulated steam locomotive with a 2-6-2+2-6-2 Double Prairie type wheel arrangement in service. Six more of these locomotives entered service in 1924.

Manufacturer
The first experimental model of eventually seven Class GB branch line Garratt articulated locomotives was one of altogether five Garratts which were ordered by the South African Railways (SAR) from Beyer, Peacock and Company (BP) in 1914. The rest of the order consisted of three narrow gauge Class NG G11 2-6-0+0-6-2 locomotives and a single experimental Class GA 2-6-0+0-6-2 mainline locomotive. Production was disrupted by the First World War, however, and BP was only able to deliver the narrow gauge locomotives in 1919 and the two Cape gauge locomotives in 1921, after cessation of hostilities.

Characteristics
The Class GB was numbered 1650, but the engine number was later changed to 2166. The locomotive was erected in the Durban shops and placed in service in June 1921. It was superheated, with a Belpaire firebox, plate frames and Walschaerts valve gear. The boiler was provided with the Gresley type air valve and mechanical lubrication was provided for the coupled wheel axle boxes.

In 1924, six more locomotives of this Class were placed in service, also built by BP and numbered in the range from 2160 to 2165. They embodied all the improvements which experience with the first engine had shown desirable. The main differences between these locomotives and the original were revised boiler proportions and a larger water bunker capacity. The most obvious difference was a more completely enclosed cab with side windows instead of the curved cut-outs in the cab sides of the first locomotive.

Service
The first locomotive was placed in service working passenger trains on the Natal South Coast line. It proved to be a successful locomotive, having good riding qualities and flexibility on light track with poor ballasting and many curves of  radius.

A couple of the second batch of locomotives joined the first one on the South Coast line for a brief period, but most went directly to the Eastern Cape where they were used on the Port Alfred branch and the Aliwal North to Barkly East line, famous for its reverses and its 1 in 30 (3⅓%) compensated ruling gradients. The Natal locomotives were soon also relocated to work there when the Class GC Garratts replaced them on the South Coast line later in 1924. They remained working on the Barkly East branch until they were withdrawn from service in 1967.

Illustration
The main picture shows the retired first Class GB, no. 2166, originally no. 1650, at Voorbaai near Mosselbaai on 4 September 1997.

References

2360
Beyer, Peacock locomotives
2-6-2+2-6-2 locomotives
Garratt locomotives
Cape gauge railway locomotives
Railway locomotives introduced in 1921
1921 in South Africa